Anouk Taggenbrock (born 13 August 1994) is a 2.5 disability class Dutch wheelchair basketball player and a member of the Netherlands women's national wheelchair basketball team. She won the gold medal at the 2020 Summer Paralympics, with the national team.

Life 
When she was 13 years old she received a spinal cord infection that resulted in a spinal cord injury. She studied at the University of Applied Sciences Utrecht (Business Administration, Pharmacy). After playing wheelchair tennis at elite level, she switched to wheelchair basketball after a Paralympic talent day.

References

1994 births
Living people
Dutch women's wheelchair basketball players
Wheelchair tennis players
Sportspeople from Utrecht (city)
Paralympic wheelchair basketball players of the Netherlands
Wheelchair basketball players at the 2020 Summer Paralympics
Medalists at the 2020 Summer Paralympics
Paralympic medalists in wheelchair basketball
Paralympic gold medalists for the Netherlands
21st-century Dutch women